Cordone is an Italian surname. Notable people with the surname include:

Daniel Cordone (born 1974), Argentine footballer
Davide Cordone (born 1971), Italian footballer
Roberto Cordone (born 1941), Italian artist and sculptor

Italian-language surnames